Kewl may refer to:

Cool (disambiguation)
KEWL
Kewl Chix
Kewl Magazine